The men's keirin was held on 23 October 2011, with 23 riders participating.

Medalists

Results

Qualifying
The first two riders in each heat qualified for the second round, remainder to first round repechage. Races were held at 11:10.

Heat 1

Heat 2

Heat 3

Heat 4

First round repechage
The first rider in each heat qualified for the second round. Races were held at 12:50.

Heat 1

Heat 2

Heat 3

Heat 4

Second round
The first three riders in each heat qualified for the final 1–6 and the others to final 7–12. Races were held at 15:30.

Heat 1

Heat 2

Finals
The 7–12 place final was held at 17:29, with the final being held at 17:33.

Final 7–12 places

Final

References

2011 European Track Championships
European Track Championships – Men's keirin